The Embassy of Costa Rica in London is the diplomatic mission of Costa Rica in the United Kingdom.  The mission was raised to the status of embassy in 1956, having previously been a legation.

María del Carmen Gutiérrez Chamberlain de Chittenden, ambassador from 1962, was the first woman ambassador accredited to the Court of St James's.

List of ambassadors

Ministers 

 1876?: Francisco María Iglesias Llorente
1882 to 1887: León Fernández Bonilla (non-resident)
1887 to 1898: Manuel María de Peralta y Alfaro (resident in Paris)
 1913 to 1919: Wenceslao de la Guardia y Fábrega
1950?: Luis Dobles Segreda (resident in?)
1954 to 1956: Virginia Prestinary de Gallegos

Ambassadors 

 1957 to ?: Humberto Pacheco Coto
1958 to 1962: Alfredo Alfaro Sotela
1962 to 1966: María del Carmen Gutiérrez Chamberlain de Chittenden
1966 to ?: Claudia Cascante de Rojas
1970 to 1974: Manuel Escalante Durán
1974 to 1977?: Eduardo Echeverría-Villafranca
1977 to 1978: Fernando Soto-Harrison
1978 to 1981: Carlos Manuel Gutiérrez-Cañas
1982 to 1986: Jorge Borbón Zeller
1986 to 1988: Marcelo Martén Sancho
1989 to 1990: Miguel Yamuni Tabush
1990 to 199(3): Luís Rafael Tinoco Alvarado
199(5) to 1998: Jorge Borbón Zeller
1998 to ?: Rodolfo Gutiérrez Carranza
2007 to 2015: Pilar Saborío de Rocafort
 2015 to 2018: José Enrique Castillo Barrantes
2018 to present: Rafael Ortiz Fábrega

References

External links
Official site

Costa Rica
Diplomatic missions of Costa Rica
Buildings and structures in the City of Westminster
Bayswater